Jéronimo Tristante (born 1969 Murcia, Spain) is a Spanish novelist and mystery writer.

Biography
Jerónimo Salmerón Tristante studied biology at the University of Murcia. Later, he worked as a biology and geology teacher in a secondary school. His first novel was Crónica de Jufré, published in 2001 as Jerónimo Salmerón Tristante, and his second novel was El Rojo en el Azul, published as Jero Salmerón. His third novel, was his best known work El Misterio de la Casa Aranda, the first mystery by Víctor Ross, which was adapted into a television series Victor Ross. His works have been translated into Polish, French and Italian.

Works
Crónica de Jufré (2003, as Jerónimo Salmerón Tristante) .
El Rojo en el Azul (2005, as Jero Salmerón) .
El Misterio de la Casa Aranda: Víctor Ros, un detective en el Madrid de finales del siglo XIX (2008)
El Caso de la Viuda Negra: las investigaciones del detective Víctor Ros entre Madrid y Córdoba a finales del siglo XIX (2008) .
El Tesoro de los Nazárenos (2009) .
1969: Un extraño caso de asesinato y corrupción en el año en que el hombre llegó a la Luna (2009) .
El enigma de la calle Calabria: el detective Víctor Ros en Barcelona (2010) ISBN 978-84-92695-87-4.
El Valle de las Sombras (2011)
Océanos de tiempo (2012) 
La última noche de Víctor Ros'''. (2013) Víctor Ros y el gran robo del oro español (2015) Secretos'' (2019)

References

External links
Official website 

1969 births
Living people
Murcian writers
People from Murcia
Spanish mystery writers